Microdrillia trina is a species of sea snail, a marine gastropod mollusk in the family Borsoniidae.

Description
The length of the shell attains 10 mm. It contains eight whorls, four in the protoconch and four in the teleoconch.

Distribution
This marine species occurs in the Gulf of Mexico.and in the Caribbean Sea. Found as a fossil of the Miocene on Trinidad.

References

 Mansfield, Wendell C. Miocene Gastropods and Scaphopods from Trinidad, British West Indies: By Wendell C. Mansfield. No 2559. From the Proceedings of the United States National Museum, Vol. 66, Art. 22, Pp. 1–65, with Pls 1–10. US Government Printing Office, 1925
 Rosenberg, G.; Moretzsohn, F.; García, E. F. (2009). Gastropoda (Mollusca) of the Gulf of Mexico, Pp. 579–699 in: Felder, D.L. and D.K. Camp (eds.), Gulf of Mexico–Origins, Waters, and Biota. Texas A&M Press, College Station, Texas

External links
 
  Bouchet P., Kantor Yu.I., Sysoev A. & Puillandre N. (2011) A new operational classification of the Conoidea. Journal of Molluscan Studies 77: 273–308

trina
Gastropods described in 1925